Asadulla Al Galib (born 26 December 1998) is a Bangladeshi cricketer. He made his first-class debut on 9 November 2019, for Sylhet Division in the 2019–20 National Cricket League.

References

External links
 

1998 births
Living people
Bangladeshi cricketers
Sylhet Division cricketers
Place of birth missing (living people)